The  is a cable-stayed bridge that is part of the Nishiseto Expressway, commonly known as the Shimanami Kaidō しまなみ海道. As of 2010 it has the fourth longest main span of any cable-stayed bridge after the Sutong Bridge. The expressway is a series of roads and bridges that is one of the three routes of the Honshū-Shikoku Bridge Project connecting the islands of Honshū and Shikoku across the Seto Inland Sea in Japan. The Kurushima-Kaikyō Bridge is on the same route.

The bridge, which opened on May 1, 1999, carries two lanes of traffic in each direction and has additional lanes for bicycles, motor bikes, and pedestrians.

The Tatara Bridge was originally planned as a suspension bridge in 1973. In 1989, the design was changed to a cable-stayed bridge with the same span. By building a cable-stayed bridge a large excavation for an anchorage would not be needed, thereby lessening the environmental impact on the surrounding area.

Construction of the bridge took a little more than six years and was accomplished without any accidents.  Many technological advancements were part of the design and testing of the bridge.

References

External links
 Tatara bridge at Honshū Shikoku Bridge Authority
  

Cable-stayed bridges in Japan
Bridges completed in 1999
Buildings and structures in Ehime Prefecture
Buildings and structures in Hiroshima Prefecture
Roads in Ehime Prefecture
Roads in Hiroshima Prefecture
1999 establishments in Japan